Jean II de la Tour du Pin (1280 – 5 March 1319, Pont de Sorgues, near Avignon) succeeded his father Humbert I as dauphin of Viennois from 1306 to 1318.  His mother was Anne of Burgundy, dauphine du Viennois.

In 1296 he married Beatrice of Hungary, daughter of Charles Martel of Anjou, titular king of Hungary, and his wife Klementia of Habsburg.  They had two children:
 Guigues VIII (1309 † 1333), dauphin of Viennois.
 Humbert II (1312 † 1355), dauphin of Viennois.

Notes

References

1280 births
1319 deaths
13th-century French people
14th-century peers of France
Dauphins of Viennois
Counts of Albon